Kseniya Aleksandrovna Rappoport (born 25 March 1974) is a Russian actress. She graduated in 2000 from Saint Petersburg Academy of Theatrical Arts and was immediately invited to join the Maly Drama Theatre. She played Nina Zarechnaya in The Seagull, Elena in Uncle Vania, and Sonia in La doppia ora.

She has appeared in films and TV series such as Streets of Broken Lights, Baron, Anna Karenina, Nicholas II (Germany), The Russian Bride, National Security Agent, Empire under Attack, Calendula Flowers, Prokofiev (Germany), Get Thee Out, Criminal Petersburg, Homicide, and I Pay Up Front and My Wife's Romance (France). She starred in the Italian films La sconosciuta (The Unknown Woman; 2006), L'uomo che ama (2008) and in the Golden Lion nominated movie La doppia ora (2009), for which she won the Volpi Cup for Best Actress at the 66th Venice Film Festival.

Biography
Rappoport was born in Leningrad, Russian SFSR, Soviet Union (now Saint Petersburg, Russia).
She made her debut in cinema at the age of 16 years, while the decision to become an actress was influenced by her role in the film Get Thee Out.

In 2000, she graduated from Saint Petersburg State Theatre Arts Academy (SPbGATI), where she studied in the class VM Filshtinsky and was immediately invited to join the trainee group in St. Petersburg Maly Drama Theater, where she is an actress at the moment. Xenia played Nina Zarechnaya in The Seagull set Lev Dodin in 2001, She also played a girl in "Claustrophobia" (MDT), Elena Andreyevna in Uncle Vanya (Prize "Gold spotlights" in 2003 for Best Actress) and Sofia in Play without Name directed by Lev Dodin in MDT, Jocasta in Oedipus Rex, Beatrice in The Servant of Two Masters and Ismenio in Antigone (State Theatre on Foundry).

In 2008, Rappoport played an opera singer whose son mysteriously disappears in the film Yuri's Day by Kirill Serebrennikov. She won the Best Actress award at the Kinotavr festival, Golden Eagle Awards and at the Russian Guild of Film Critics Awards.
In September 2009 for The Double Hour she won the prize of the Venice Film Festival for Best Actress.

In December 2009, Rappoport was awarded the title Honored Artist of the Russian Federation.

On 27 June 2012, at the 58th International Film Festival in Taormina (Sicily, Italy) Rappoport awarded the prize Golden Lion, founded by the Province of Messina.

In 2012, she was awarded the Golden Eagle Award for her role in film Two Days (2011).

At the 35th Moscow International Film Festival, she was awarded a Stanislavsky Award "For conquest of tops of actor's skill and loyalty to the principles of Stanislavsky school".

In 2013, Rappoport won in the category "Skill actor" (Best Actress) awarded the International Prize of Stanislavsky (2012-2013 theater season) for the role of Lady Milford in the play Intrigue and Love directed by Lev Dodin (MDT Theater of Europe). In 2014 she became the winner of "Top 50 Most famous people of St. Petersburg" in the theater for active work in the Board of Trustees "Children Bella" and the role of Ranevskaya in The Cherry Orchard by Lev Dodin.

In March 2015, she was awarded the prize of the Association of producers of film and television in the field of television movies as Best Actress TV Movie/Series for the role of Olga in the TV series Ladoga.

Personal life 

Rappoport's father was Jewish, and she has stated that she never hid her Jewish ethnicity.

Rappoport was married to Russian businessman Viktor Tarasov (divorced). Their daughter is actress Darya-Aglaya Tarasova. She later married Russian actor Yuri Kolokolnikov, and they have a daughter Sofia, born January 2011.

Kseniya Rappoport is currently married to restaurateur, Dmitriy Borisov. Sometime prior to February 2016 she made public the marriage which occurred privately sometime earlier.

Filmography

Film

Television

References

External links

Maly Drama Theatre – Theatre of Europe

1974 births
21st-century Russian actresses
Living people
Actresses from Saint Petersburg
David di Donatello winners
Honored Artists of the Russian Federation
People's Artists of Russia
Russian film actresses
Russian stage actresses
Russian television actresses
Volpi Cup for Best Actress winners
Jewish Russian actors
Russian people of Jewish descent
Russian activists against the 2022 Russian invasion of Ukraine